is a private university at Nakatsugawa, Gifu, Japan. The school was founded as a junior college in 1966 and became a four-year college in 1993.

External links
 Official website 

Educational institutions established in 1966
Private universities and colleges in Japan
Universities and colleges in Gifu Prefecture
1966 establishments in Japan